Tabi Love (born 11 September 1991) is a Canadian volleyball player. She is a current member of the Canada women's national volleyball team. Love has been playing professionally since graduating from University of California, Los Angeles in December 2012. She has played for Criollas de Caguas, Budowlani Łódź, Azeryol Baku and Schweriner SC. She is currently playing in France for the ASPTT Mulhouse. 

Love has been involved with the Canadian Women's Volleyball program since she first joined their youth team in 2005. Her first international debut with the Senior A team was in the summer of 2013. Since then she has competed at many events, most notably at the 2014 FIVB Volleyball Women's World Championship in Italy as well as the 2015 Pan American Games in Toronto.

Back in her college days at UCLA, Love earned First Team All-America honors and was an integral part of the 2011 Bruins squad that won the NCAA Division I Women's Volleyball Championship.

Clubs
  Criollas de Caguas (2013)
  Budowlani Łódź (2013–2014)
  Azeryol Baku (2014–2015)
  Schweriner SC (2015–2016)
  Incheon Heungkuk Life Pink Spiders (2016–2017)
  ASPTT Mulhouse (2017 – present)

References

1991 births
Living people
Canadian women's volleyball players
Place of birth missing (living people)
Volleyball players at the 2015 Pan American Games
Pan American Games competitors for Canada
Opposite hitters
Outside hitters
UCLA Bruins women's volleyball players
Expatriate volleyball players in the United States
Canadian expatriate sportspeople in Puerto Rico
Expatriate volleyball players in Poland
Expatriate volleyball players in Azerbaijan
Expatriate volleyball players in Germany
Expatriate volleyball players in South Korea
Expatriate volleyball players in France
Canadian expatriate sportspeople in the United States
Canadian expatriate sportspeople in Poland
Canadian expatriate sportspeople in Germany
Canadian expatriate sportspeople in South Korea
Canadian expatriate sportspeople in France
Minnesota Golden Gophers women's volleyball players
Canadian expatriate sportspeople in Azerbaijan